Federal Highway 11 (Fed. 11 ) is a toll-free part of the federal highway corridors. Fed. 11 runs from Fed. 1 in La Paz, Baja California Sur to Pichilingue (the port of La Paz), a total length of 18 km (11.18 mi).

References

011